Fields, Factories, and Workshops is an 1899 book by anarchist Peter Kropotkin that discusses the decentralization of industries, possibilities of agriculture, and uses of small industries. Before this book on economics, Kropotkin had been known for his militant activity in behalf of international anarchism and writings on Siberian geography. Through the book, he sought to connect anarchism with science, based on sociological tendencies. The book was compiled from essays he had published in Nineteenth Century and Forum between 1888 and 1890. The book was first published in 1899 by Houghton-Mifflin (Boston) and Hutchinson (London) to favorable reviews among Britons. It has since been republished in multiple editions: Swan Sonnenschein (London) and Putnam (New York) in 1901, 1904, 1907, 1909, and Nelson (London) and Putnam (New York) in 1913 and 1919. Reproductions of the first and second editions appeared in 1968. A later edition, edited by Colin Ward for Harper & Row, released in 1974 with more contemporary illustrations as Fields, Factories and Workshops Tomorrow.

See also 
 List of books about anarchism

Bibliography

References

Further reading

External links 

 Fields, Factories and Workshops at the Internet Archive
 
 Fields, Factories and Workshops,  or Industry Combined with Agriculture and Brain Work with Manual Work 

1899 non-fiction books
Works by Peter Kropotkin
Books about anarchism
Houghton Mifflin books
English-language books